René Nico Hubertus Klaassen (born March 4, 1961 in Velp) is a former field hockey defender from the Netherlands, who participated in two Summer Olympics: in Los Angeles (1984) and in Seoul (1988).

He ended up in sixth place in California with the Dutch National Men's Team, and won the bronze medal in South Korea four years later, after defeating Australia (2-1) in the Bronze Medal Game. Klaassen earned a total number of 126 caps, scoring three goals, in the years 1984–1990. He was also on the side that won the world title in Lahore, Pakistan. After that tournament he retired from international competition.

External links
 
 Dutch Hockey Federation

1961 births
Living people
People from Rheden
Sportspeople from Gelderland
Dutch male field hockey players
Olympic field hockey players of the Netherlands
Field hockey players at the 1984 Summer Olympics
Field hockey players at the 1988 Summer Olympics
Olympic bronze medalists for the Netherlands
Medalists at the 1988 Summer Olympics
1990 Men's Hockey World Cup players
20th-century Dutch people
21st-century Dutch people